Pt. Sitaram Chaturvedi (27 January 1907 – 17 February 2005), also known as Acharya Sita Ram Chaturvedi, was an eminent Indian educator, dramatist and scholar of Hindi and Sanskrit language and literature.

Biography 
Chaturvedi was born in a renowned Brahmin family in Varanasi, India.  His father Pandit Bhimsen Vedpathi Chaturvedi was a learned Sanskrit scholar of Vedic studies. He received his graduate and post-graduate education from Benaras Hindu University and later served as a professor at the university.

Contributions 
Chaturvedi wrote more than 70 plays in Hindi, Sanskrit and English, and directed, staged and acted in many others. He was an active participant in Bombay's Prithvi Theatre and was conferred the title of Abhinav Bharat. He also wrote more than 250 books on language, grammar, literature, plays, theatre etc.; edited the collected works of Kalidasa; and wrote biographies of Madan Mohan Malviya, Tulsidas and Vallabhacharya.

Legacy
In 1968, Chaturvedi Ji founded the Bal Vishwavidyalaya (now known as the Bal Vidyalayay Madhyamik School) in Varanasi, with the aim of "multi-dimensional, progressive and character building personality within a child". The school was established to implement the educational precepts laid down by Chaturvedi, including introducing the child to crafts such as carpentry, pottery, spinning cotton yarn, doll making and weaving; and not having examinations till the fifth grades.

The 11-day theatre festival Natya Andolan, in Varanasi, is dedicated to the memory of Sitaram Chaturvedi.

Since Chaturvedi Ji has founded Akhil Bhartiya Vikram Parishad, Kashi under the guidance of  Bharat Ratna  Mahamana Pt. Madan Mohan Malviya Ji, it was pleasure that Mahamana Malviya had accepted to be first Chief of the said Parishad, involved in research activity of Hindi & Sanskrit literature. On the occasion of Sri Chaturvedi Ji Birth Centenory year 2008 Akhil Bhartiya Vikram Parishad, Kashi has started to honour one of any authority of literature, drama field, education, art & culture etc.with the honour of Srijan Manishi. Renowned poet Padmabhushan Dr. Gopal Dass Neeraj was the first recipient of Srijan Manishi in year 2008 and Mahant Yogi Sri 108 Chand Nath Ji of Abohar (Haryana) follower of Nath Samprdaya was the second recipient of Srijan Manishi in 2009. Poet Sri Kishan Saroj and Dr. Prakash Dwivedi are third and fourth recipient of Srijan Manishi for the year 2010 & 2011 respectively. In the year 2012 noted journalist and media person Sri Sharad Dutt was recipient of Srijan Manishi title. On 106th Birth Day of Acharya Ji a renowned Kathak Dancer Padma Bhushan Kum Uma Sharma was confirmed with Srijan Manishi as 6th recipient. A renowned Hindi & Maithil poet Dr Buddhi Nath Mishra is 7th recipient of Srijan Manishi on 27 Jan.'2014. On 27th Jan.'2015 renowned Hindi Poet Padmshree Ashok Charkradhar was confirmed with Srijan Manishi as 8th recipient.

Awards
 Hindi gaurav samman, Uttar Pradesh Hindi Sansthan, 2001.
 Honorary Doctor of Letters (Vidya Vachasapati), Kameshwar Singh Darbhanga Sanskrit University, 2003.

Selected bibliography

Hindi plays

"Hans Mayur"
Vasant
Mangal Prabhat
Bechara Keshawa
Alka
Poorva Kalidas
Ajanta
Shabree
Vasant
Siddhartha
Padukabhishek
Acharya Vishnugupta
Aparadh
Man Na Man
Pap Ki Chhaya 
Vishwash
Paras
Vikramaditya
Alka
Yug Badal Raha Hai
Anarkali
Gundaa
Aparadhee
Jago Ek Bar Phir
Padukabhishek
Senapati Pushyamitra
Dant Mudra Rakshas
Som Nath
Acharya Vishnu Gupta
Shree Krishan Sudama
Paras
Atmatyag
Tulsi Ka Varagya
Yug Badal Raha Hai
Valmiki
AAdikavya Ka Janm
Narad Moh
Abhinav Natya Shastra
Meera Bai
Shree Krishna Doot
Savitri Satyavan
Sati Ka Tej
Harsha Vardhan
Rajiya
Baglol Dulha
Maulana Ka Nikah
Meera Bai
Shree Krishna Doot
Bhishma Pratigyan
Sita Ram
Teen Totale
AAp Kaun Hai
Ghar Kiska
Abhineta Banane Ki Dhun
Sabka Baap
Angulimal
Mayavee
Bhagwan Buddha
AAdhi Raat
Nayee Basti
Udghatan
Sabha Pati Ji
Private Secretary
Meri Maa Lag Gayee Aag ........
Ladies First
Makhee Choos
Udhav Braj Me Aai Gaye
Chandrika
Vigyan Ka Dambha ya Machine Man
Sharanagat
Chetana
Patthar Me Pran
Pralobhan

English plays

Satvir Baapu
Mother Land

Jeewan Charitra

BHAKTA JEEWAN LAL (1927)
MAHAMANA MADAN MOHAN MALVIYA (1935) With Essays & lECTURE
PANDIT BHAWANI BHIKH MISHRA (1936)
MUNSHEEJI AUR UNKI PRATIBHA (1947)
JAGADGURU SHREECHANDRACHARYA (1953)
PANDIT VIDYADHAR JI GAUR (1954)
SHREEMAD VALLBHACHARYA AUR UNKA PUSHTIMARG (1966) Hindi Sahitya Kutira, Varanasi.
PANDIT MADAN MOHAN MALVIYA (1972) in Hindi Publications Division, Ministry of Information and Broadcasting, Government of India, New Delhi.
PANDIT MADAN MOHAN MALVIYA (1973) in English Publications Division, Ministry of Information and Broadcasting, Government of India, New Delhi.
MAHAKAVI SURDASS (1976)

Textbooks

SANSKRIT – MANORAMA PART I 
SANSKRIT – MANORAMA PART II 
KABIR SANGRAH  (1960)
SUR – PAD – PANCHSHATI (1976)
 
Books
 Bhasha ki Shiksha (1940), Hindi Sahitya Kutir, Varanasi.
 Do paurāṇika nāṭaka (1952), (with Kanaiyalal Maneklal Munshi) Hindi Sahitya Kutir, Varanasi.
 Samiks̀a-Sāstra (1953), Vikram-Parisada, Banaras.
  (1954), Akhila Bharatiya Vikramaparishat, Kasi
 Goswami Tulsidas (1956), Chowkhamba Vidyabhawan, Varanasi.
  (1956), Hindi Sahitya Kutir, Varanasi.
 , (1956), Hindi Sahitya Kutir, Varanasi.
  (1958), Sadhubela Ashram, Varanasi.
  (A comprehensive study in linguistics) (1969), Chowkhamba Vidyabhavan, Varanasi.
 Bharat ke Udasin sant  (1968), (with Bhānudatta Miśra)   
 Bhartiya Aur Europeae Shiksha Ka Itihaas The capital of Buddhism, Sarnath (1968), Orient Publishers, Varanasi.
  (A critical work on the contents and art of literature and principles of their judicious application on various literary forms) (1970), Chowkhamba Sanskrit Series Office, Varanasi.
 Shiksha darshan (1970), Hindi Samiti, Suchna Vibhag, Lucknow.
 Madan Mohan Malaviya (1972), Publications Division, Ministry of Information and Broadcasting, Government of India, New Delhi.
  (1981), (with Ema Bī Śāha) , Gujarat.
 , (1996) (with Kunal, Kishor), Mahavir Mandir Prakashan, Patna. 
 Kalidasa: Granthavali (Collected works of Kalidasa) (1944) (Ed.), Akhila Bharatiya Vikramaparishat, Kasi.

 As an editor 
Achrya Chaturvedi had served the Chief Editor of various News Paper & Magazines :Donn  – English Monthly, Banaras Hindu University, 1927–28Sanatan Dharm  – Hindi Weakly, Kashi, 1933–38Bhatiya Vidya – Hindi Monthly, Kashi, 1933–38Sanatan Dharm  – Hindi Weakly, Bombay, 1947–49Patibha – Hindi Monthly, Bombay, 1948Sangram – Hindi Monthly, Bombay, 1949Basanti – Hindi Monthly, Kashi, 1950–1958Sankalp'' – Hindi Monthly, Calcutta, 1962–63

Apart from above Sri Chaturvadi Ji had honoured the post of President-Acharya : Bhartiya Patrkarita Mahavidyalya, Kashi during the year 1972–1974.

See also
 List of Indian writers

References

External links
Bal Vidyalayay Madhyamik School

1907 births
2005 deaths
Hindi-language writers
Indian male dramatists and playwrights
Banaras Hindu University alumni
Academic staff of Banaras Hindu University
20th-century Indian educators
Indian Sanskrit scholars
Indian magazine editors
Scholars from Varanasi
20th-century Indian biographers
20th-century Indian dramatists and playwrights
Dramatists and playwrights from Uttar Pradesh
Male biographers